The 2021 season was the Kansas City Chiefs' 52nd season in the National Football League, their 62nd overall and their ninth under head coach Andy Reid. Looking to become the fourth team in NFL history to make three straight Super Bowls, the Chiefs began the season slow, at 3-4 but would finish the regular season 12–5, winning the AFC West division title for the sixth consecutive season. The Chiefs would make, and host, their fourth straight conference championship, but lost to the Cincinnati Bengals in overtime 24–27. 

This would be the final season with long-time wide receiver Tyreek Hill, as he was traded to the Miami Dolphins on March 23, 2022. A 6-time Pro Bowler during his time with Kansas City, Hill's final game with the Chiefs was on January 30, 2022, the aforementioned AFC Championship Game vs. the Bengals.

Head coach Andy Reid recorded his 100th win as the Chiefs head coach on October 3, 2021, a 42–30 win over his former team, Philadelphia Eagles. Reid became the first coach in NFL history to win 100 games as a head coach with multiple teams as well as the first to lead multiple teams to four straight Conference Championships, previously doing so with the Eagles from the 2001 to 2004 seasons.

Season summary
On March 4, 2021, the Chiefs announced that they had officially renamed Arrowhead Stadium, GEHA Field at Arrowhead Stadium.

The Chiefs lost two of their longest tenured players in the offseason. Tackle Eric Fisher was released and fullback Anthony Sherman retired. Both players joined the Chiefs in 2013.

In the offseason, the Chiefs announced they would once again retire their live horse mascot Warpaint to continue with their commitment to stop using Native American imagery.

The Chiefs opened the season on September 12 with a 33–29 victory over the Cleveland Browns. The win was the Chiefs' 15th consecutive win in September. The Chiefs would lose their next two games to give them a 1–2 record after three games, which was their first losing record in 89 games, dating back to week 10 of the 2015 season. The Chiefs' 20–38 week 5 loss to the Buffalo Bills, was the Chiefs' first double-digit loss in the regular season since 2017 and the Chiefs' first double-digit loss at home since 2014. In Week 7, the Chiefs lost 3–27 to the Tennessee Titans, which is the fewest points scored in a game since Patrick Mahomes became the quarterback. The Chiefs maintained a non-winning record until a week 9 victory over the Green Bay Packers. That 7-week stretch without a winning record was the Chiefs' longest stretch without a winning record since 2012 when they held a losing record the entire season. After starting the season 3–4, the Chiefs won their ninth game in week 14 over the Las Vegas Raiders clinching their ninth consecutive winning season, one short of the franchise record of 10. The 48–9 victory over the Raiders was the largest in franchise history over the Raiders and the largest victory against any opponent since the 2006 season. In week 16, following a 36–10 victory over the Steelers and a loss by the Chargers, the Chiefs clinched their sixth consecutive AFC West division championship and their franchise record seventh straight playoff berth. The Chiefs finished the regular season 12–5, their fourth consecutive 12-win season, all four since Patrick Mahomes became the starting quarterback.

Kansas City defeated the Pittsburgh Steelers 42–21 in the Wild Card round of the 2021–22 NFL playoffs. They would then host Buffalo in the Divisional round, winning that game 42–36 in overtime. This game was hailed as one of the greatest modern NFL playoff games, with both teams combining for 25 points in the final two minutes of regulation. The following week, despite being favored to win the AFC Championship game, the Chiefs would lose the game in an upset to the Bengals in overtime 24–27, a game in which they led 21–3 at one point in the second quarter.

NFL Top 100

NFL Network began announcing their annual top 100 list on August 15, 2021. Five Chiefs players were named to the list. Defensive end Frank Clark is the only player still on the roster that was ranked the previous season that went unranked for the 2021 season. Tight end Travis Kelce was ranked 5th, which is the highest ranking ever for a tight end in the history of the Top 100. Quarterback Patrick Mahomes was ranked 1st on the list, which was the first time a Chiefs player was ranked the number one.

Offseason
Transactions listed below occurred between the day after Super Bowl LV, February 8, and August 14, the day of the Chiefs first preseason game.

Source unless otherwise noted

Coaching staff changes

Players lost
Below are players who were on the roster at the end of the 2020 season, but were either released or did not re-sign after their contract expired. If a player resigns during the offseason, their name will be removed from the list.

Retirements
Players that were on the Chiefs roster at the end of the season who announced their retirement before the preseason are listed below, even if their contract with the Chiefs had officially expired prior to their announcement.

Players added

Trades
Listed below are trades were a player was included in the trade.

Draft

Trades 
 The Chiefs traded a sixth-round selection (213th overall) in the 2021 draft to the Tennessee Titans in exchange for a seventh-round selection in the 2020 NFL Draft.
 The Chiefs received a sixth-round selection (207th overall) in the 2021 draft from the Miami Dolphins in exchange for a seventh-round selection (258th overall) in the 2021 draft and running back DeAndre Washington.
 The Chiefs traded their first-round selection (31st overall), third-round selection (94th overall), fourth-round selection (136th overall) in the 2021 draft, and a fifth-round selection in the 2022 NFL Draft to the Baltimore Ravens in exchange for offensive tackle Orlando Brown Jr., a second-round selection (58th overall) in the 2021 draft, and a sixth-round selection in the 2022 NFL Draft.
 The Chiefs traded their fourth-round selection (175th overall) and their sixth-round selection (207th overall) to the New York Jets in exchange for the Jets fourth-round selection (162nd overall) and a sixth-round selection (226th overall).

Undrafted free agents

Signed and released in the offseason
Below are players who were signed and released in the offseason before playing for the team.

Preseason transactions
Transactions listed below, occurred between August 15, the day after the Chiefs first preseason game, and September 12, the day of the Chiefs first regular season game.

Source for all transactions

Cut to 85
The first preseason roster cutdown occurred on August 17. In addition the transactions below, the Chiefs placed running back Elijah McGuire on injured reserve.

Cut to 80
The second preseason cutdown occurred on August 24. The Chiefs released or waived five players and did not use reserve lists to make the 80 player limit.

Final cutdown
The third and final preseason cutdown occurred on August 31. In addition to the transactions below, the Chiefs traded a player, placed Kyle Long on the physically unable to perform list, and placed Malik Herring on the reserve/non-football injury list.

Trades
Listed below are trades were a player was included in the trade.

Signings

Regular season transactions
Below are transactions that occurred after the Chiefs first game through their final game. Transactions below are only transactions related to the Chiefs active roster. Practice squad transactions will not be included.

Source for transactions through December 31

Source for transactions after January 1

Standard elevations
Standard practice squad elevations allow a player to elevated from the practice squad to the active roster for a single game and revert back to the practice squad following the game. Below are standard elevations used by the Chiefs during the season.

Non-standard elevations
Below are players elevated from the practice squad using a non-standard elevation, meaning, if the Chiefs want them to go back to the practice squad, they must clear waivers then sign them back to the practice squad.

Trades
Listed below are trades where a player was included in the trade.

Players cut

Injured reserve activations
Players listed below were activated off injured reserve

COVID-19 protocols
The following players missed games because of the NFL's COVID-19 protocols. Typically, a player misses because of a positive test. Vaccinated players can return simply after a subsequent negative test, unvaccinated players are out for five days.

Staff

Final roster

Preseason

Regular season

Schedule

Note: Intra-division opponents are in bold text.

Game summaries

Week 1: vs. Cleveland Browns

Week 2: at Baltimore Ravens

Week 3: vs. Los Angeles Chargers

Week 4: at Philadelphia Eagles

Week 5: vs. Buffalo Bills

Week 6: at Washington Football Team

Week 7: at Tennessee Titans

Week 8: vs. New York Giants

Week 9: vs. Green Bay Packers

Week 10: at Las Vegas Raiders

Week 11: vs. Dallas Cowboys

Week 13: vs. Denver Broncos

Week 14: vs. Las Vegas Raiders

Week 15: at Los Angeles Chargers

Week 16: vs. Pittsburgh Steelers

Week 17: at Cincinnati Bengals

Week 18: at Denver Broncos

Standings

Division

Conference

Postseason

Schedule

Game summaries

AFC Wild Card Playoffs: vs. (7) Pittsburgh Steelers

AFC Divisional Playoffs: vs. (3) Buffalo Bills

AFC Championship: vs. (4) Cincinnati Bengals

Statistics

Team

Individual

Statistics correct as of the end of the 2021 NFL season

References

External links
 

Kansas City
Kansas City Chiefs seasons
AFC West championship seasons
Kansas City Chiefs